is a railway station in Kita-ku, Kobe, Hyōgo Prefecture, Japan.

Lines
Kobe Electric Railway
Ao Line

Adjacent stations

Railway stations in Japan opened in 1936
Railway stations in Hyōgo Prefecture